Blackie (1907-1942) was a horse in service with the British Army during the First World War. His grave in Knowsley, Merseyside, became a grade II listed monument in 2017.

References 

1907 animal births
1942 animal deaths
Horses in the United Kingdom
Individual warhorses